7-Hydroxymitragynine is a terpenoid indole alkaloid from the plant Mitragyna speciosa, commonly known as Kratom. It is often referred to as ‘7-OH’. It was first described in 1994 and is a natural product derived from the mitragynine present in the Kratom leaf. It is considered an oxidized derivative and active metabolite of mitragynine. 7-OH binds to opioid receptors like mitragynine, but research suggests that 7-OH binds with greater potency and contributes heavily to the analgesic activity of mitragynine as a metabolite.

Metabolism 
After a kratom study, it was revealed that 7-OH converts into Mitragynine pseudoindoxyl.

Pharmacology 
7-Hydroxymitragynine, like mitragynine, appears to be a mixed opioid receptor agonist/antagonist, acting as a partial agonist at µ-opioid receptors and as a competitive antagonist at δ- and κ-opioid receptors. Evidence suggests that 7-OH is more potent than both mitragynine and morphine. 7-OH does not activate the β-arrestin pathway like traditional opioids, meaning symptoms such as respiratory depression, constipation and sedation are much less pronounced.

7-OH is generated from mitragynine in vivo by hepatic metabolism and may account for a significant portion of the effects traditionally associated with mitragynine. Although 7-OH occurs naturally in kratom leaves, it does so in such low amounts that any ingested 7-OH is inconsequential compared to the 7-OH generated in the body.

See also 
 Ajmalicine
 Mitragynine
 Mitragynine pseudoindoxyl
 Mitraphylline
 β-Prodine - molecule overlaying 7-hydroxymitragynine's opioid QSAR (Quantitative structure-activity relationship)

References

Further reading 
 

Tryptamine alkaloids
Opioids
Biased ligands
Indoloquinolizines
Mu-opioid receptor agonists
Tertiary alcohols
Ethers
Conjugated dienes